James Arthur is the eponymously titled debut studio album by British singer and songwriter James Arthur. It was released on 1 November 2013 by Syco Music. The album includes the singles "Impossible" (Arthur's X Factor winner's single), and "You're Nobody 'til Somebody Loves You", as well as collaborations with Emeli Sandé and Chasing Grace.

The album debuted at number 2 on the UK Albums Chart, kept off the top spot by Eminem's The Marshall Mathers LP 2. It became the 30th best-selling album of the year in the UK, despite iTunes offering refunds for fans after Arthur became embroiled in a homophobia row. As of 16 February 2017, it has sold over 287,000 copies in the UK.

Background
On 9 December 2012, Arthur won the ninth series of the ITV music competition series The X Factor. As the winner, he was signed to Simon Cowell's record label Syco Music and released a "cover of Shontelle's 2010 single "Impossible", which debuted at number one on the UK Singles Chart.

On 3 March 2013, Arthur announced via Twitter that would be starting work on his debut album the following morning, stating "Can't wait to get in the studio tomorrow!!". Several tracks on the album feature co-writing and production from Naughty Boy, and collaborations with Emeli Sandé and Chasing Grace, on the tracks "Roses" and "Certain Things" respectively. Naughty Boy said of the album; "It's really cool actually, it's definitely poppy but with an edge and a bit urban. One of the songs that me and Emeli wrote [for him] is like a big orchestral piece and it has no drums. It's a real album, I think a lot of people are going to be surprised with his album."

Promotion
Arthur performed "You're Nobody 'til Somebody Loves You" on The Jonathan Ross Show on 12 October, the Australian version of The X Factor on 14 October, Friday Download on 1 November and Daybreak on 4 November. He also performed at the BBC Radio 1 Teen Awards and switch on the Christmas lights in London's Oxford Street and in Manchester, with performances in both places as well.

On 11 October, a free download of an acoustic version of "New Tattoo" was available to download on the Amazon MP3 to celebrate the release of the album.

Arthur performed his third single "Recovery" on The X Factor on 1 December 2013. It then debuted at 19 on the UK Singles Chart on 8 December 2013.

Singles
 "Impossible", Arthur's X Factor winner's single, is included as the fourth track on the album. It was released on 9 December 2012. It became the fastest-selling X Factor winner's single so far, reaching 255,000 downloads within 48 hours and over 490,000 by the end of the week. The single topped the UK Singles Chart in its first week of release and also peaked at number one in Ireland, Greece and the Czech Republic, number two in Australia, New Zealand and Switzerland, and number three in Belgium.
 "You're Nobody 'til Somebody Loves You" was released as the album's official lead single on 20 October 2013. It premiered on UK radio stations on 19 September 2013. The song was initially set for release in July, but was delayed due a throat infection that Arthur was suffering from. The music video premiered on 30 September 2013. It reached number two in the UK, beaten to the top spot by Lorde's "Royals".
"Recovery" was released as the third single on 15 December 2013. It was written by James Arthur, Ina Wroldsen and Tiago Carvalho. It debuted at 19 on the UK Singles Chart on 8 December 2013.
"Get Down" was released as the fourth single off of the album in March 2014 in the UK.

Critical response

The album received mixed reviews from critics. On Metacritic, it holds an average score of 58 based on ten reviews, indicating "mixed or average reviews". Lewis Corner of Digital Spy gave it 4/5 stars, saying that Arthur has "The angst of Plan B and defiance of Emeli Sandé". Writing for EntertainmentWise, Natalie Palmer wrote, "A mix of soul, rock and a splash of rap to make for an amazing debut...With X Factor's input it's hard not to be worried that even the best acts will come out with completely over-produced manufactured rubbish. However, a year later James Arthur is back with his self-titled debut album and we can assure you it won't disappoint."

Andy Gill of The Independent, however, was more negative. He gave the album two stars and said, "The opener, "You're Nobody 'Til Somebody Loves You", is a decent showcase for his burly-voiced brand of R&B pop – but elsewhere, Arthur grossly overdoes the emotional groaning that passes for vocal expression in the album's more overwrought corners." In his review for the Metro, John Lewis stated that "the good moments are overwhelmed by the stench of focus-grouped blandness." and awarded the album two stars. In an extremely negative review, Sylvie Levished of Evigshed mag gave the album 1/5 and wrote "All in All, not really sure if James Arthur's behavior is the best way to promote his music specially when he is just a beginner  in the music industry. His album is nothing special. Very different from factor winners, the young songwriter/singer shines until now, with his narcissism, his pride, an extreme disrespectful for his label mates and other young artists, coupled with a big arrogance in media and through his twitter account. If he put as much energy into his music, it would certainly be better. It is cold, without emotion. Not recommended."

Track listing

Notes
 signifies an additional producer.
 signifies a co-producer.

Sample credits
"You're Nobody 'til Somebody Loves You" features samples from the recording "I Love Lucy" performed by Albert King.
"Get Down" features samples from the recording "N.T (Part 1)" performed by Kool & The Gang.
"Lie Down" contains elements of "Pull, Jabul, Pull", written by J.J. Johnson. Sample recreation produced by Hal Ritson and Richard Adlam.

Credits and personnel
(Credits taken from AllMusic and James Arthurs liner notes.)

Grace Ackerman – composer, vocals
Richard Adlam – drums, producer, programming
Graham Archer – vocal engineer
James Arthur – composer, guitar, primary artist, vocals, vocals 
Shakil Ashraf – composer
Tom Barnes – composer, drums, instrumentation
Xavier Barnet – chorus
Robert Bell – composer
Ronald Bell – composer
William Bell – composer
Biffco – producer
Dan Bingham – percussion, wurlitzer
Arnthor Birgisson – composer
Tim Blacksmith – management
Riki Bleau – management
Delbert Bowers – assistant
George Brown – composer
Tiago Carvalho – composer, instrumentation, producer
Lurine Cato – chorus, vocals 
Austen Jux Chandler – engineer
Jo Changer – assistant contractor
Chasing Grace – featured artist
Ernest Clark – composer
Simon Clarke – arranger, sax , sax 
Wez Clarke – mix down
Jonny Coffer – composer, piano, strings
Ben Collier – programming, string arrangements
Roz Colls – string contractor
Rupert Coulson – engineer
Tom Coyne – mastering
Craze – additional production
Fiona Cruickshank – assistant
Da Internz – producer
Danny D. – management
Gleyder "Gee" Disla – engineer
Jimmy Douglass – additional production, mixing
Bradford Ellis – composer, instrumentation, producer, programming
Joy Farrukh – chorus
Sean "Elijah Blake" Fenton – composer
Ben Foster – conductor, orchestration
Matt Furmidge – producer
Chris Galland – assistant
Serban Ghenea – mixing
Cameron Gower-Poole – assistant engineer
Isobel Griffiths – contractor
Komi & JL – additional production, programming
Roy Handy – composer
John Hanes – engineer
Ben Harrison – composer, guitar
Wayne Hector – composer
David Asante – composer
Richard Henry – trombone
Ben Hewlett – harmonica
HOAX – additional production
Cleveland Horne – composer
Ash Howes – composer, instrumentation, mixing, producer, programming
Eric Jackson – composer
Jaycen Joshua – mixing
J.J. Johnson – composer
Booker T. Jones – composer
Priscilla Jones – choir arrangement, vocals 
Ryan Kaul – assistant
Pete Kelleher – composer, instrumentation, keyboards
Claude Kelly – composer, vocal producer
The Kick Horns – horn
Ben Kohn – bass, composer, instrumentation
Dave Liddell – trombone
Dom Liu – assistant engineer
Manny Marroquin – mixing
Cliff Masterson – choir arrangement, conductor, string arrangements
Paul Meehan – programming
Robert "Spike" Mickens – composer
Mike Moore – guitar
James Murray – composer, engineer, instrumentation, vocals
Naughty Boy – composer, engineer, instrumentation, producer
Everton Nelson – orchestra leader
Zach Nicholls – engineer
Gary Noble – mixing
Mustafa Omer – engineer, instrumentation, vocals
Mustapha Omer – composer
Marcos Palacios – composer
Mark Pellizzer – guitar
Adam Phillips – guitar
Phil Plested – composer, guitar
Ryan Quigley – trumpet
Gene Redd – composer
Salaam Remi – arranger, bass, composer, drums, keyboards, producer
James Reynolds – mixing
Hal Ritson – keyboards, producer
Steve Robson – composer, guitar, keyboards, producer, vocal producer
Gene C. Rodd – composer
Gustave Rudman – arranger, instrumentation, orchestration, producer
Emeli Sandé – composer, primary artist, vocals
Tim Sanders – arranger, sax (tenor)
Tim Sandiford – bass, guitar
Claydes Smith – composer
Jonny Solway – assistant
Steve Stacey – design
Graham Stack – producer
Richard "Biff" Stannard – producer
Richard Stannard – composer, instrumentation, programming
Sunny – engineer
Dennis Thomas – composer
TMS – producer
Tom Upex – assistant
The Wade Brothers – photography
Richard Westfield – composer
Ina Wroldsen – composer, vocals

Charts and certifications

Weekly charts

Year-end charts

Certifications

Release history

References

James Arthur albums
2013 debut albums
Albums produced by Da Internz
Albums produced by Mike Dean (record producer)
Albums produced by Naughty Boy
Albums produced by Salaam Remi
Albums produced by Steve Robson
Albums produced by Richard Stannard (songwriter)
Albums produced by Ash Howes
Albums produced by TMS (production team)